Laura Main (born 8 March 1977) is a Scottish actress known for her role as Sister Bernadette (later Dr. Turner's wife Shelagh Turner) and Nurse Shelagh Turner in the BBC One drama series Call the Midwife.

Early life and education 
Laura Main was born in Aberdeen. Her father, Robert, was a fish merchant and her mother, Lorna, was a primary school teacher turned housewife. She has two older sisters, a niece, and two nephews.

Laura Main went to school at the Hazlehead Academy and took dance lessons at the Danscentre in Aberdeen. She then studied history at the University of Aberdeen, gaining an MA History of Art in 1998 before starting drama school at the Webber Douglas Academy of Dramatic Art in London.

Career
Main started performing in musical theatre at the age of 13 when she landed the role of Annie with Phoenix Youth Theatre. At age 15 she debuted in the role of Louisa Von Trapp in a stage production of The Sound of Music. At university she performed as part of the musical society Treading the Boards in Aberdeen. She has performed on stage in several productions with the Royal Shakespeare Company. In 2011 she appeared in the Stephen Sondheim musical Company.

In 2011 she was cast as Sister Bernadette in the hit BBC series Call the Midwife. Main features as a soloist in several tracks on the Call the Midwife album released in February 2013. In November 2015 Main won the Children in Need Strictly Come Dancing special with dancer Brendan Cole.

In 2017, Main was cast in the lead role of Princess Fiona, in the second UK tour of Shrek The Musical. Main shared the role with The X Factor contestant Amelia Lily. Main's first performance was on 12 December 2017, at the Edinburgh Playhouse.

Filmography

Theatre

References

External links 
 

Living people
1981 births
Scottish film actresses
Scottish musical theatre actresses
Scottish stage actresses
Scottish television actresses
Actresses from Aberdeen
Alumni of the Webber Douglas Academy of Dramatic Art
People educated at Hazlehead Academy
People from Aberdeen
21st-century Scottish actresses